Centroneuralia is a proposed clade of animals with bilateral symmetry as an embryo, consisting of the Chordata and Protostomia, united by the presence of a central nervous system. An alternative to the traditional protostome-deuterostome dichotomy, it has found weak support in several studies. Under this hypothesis, Centroneuralia would be sister to Xenambulacraria (Xenacoelomorpha + Ambulacraria) at the base of Bilateria.

Centroneuralia, as a proposed clade, originates in phylogenomics. More precisely, recent studies correlate support for Deuterostomia with simpler, site-homogeneous models, while more sophisticated and site-heterogeneous models recover Centroneuralia more often.

Phylogeny

References 

Controversial taxa
Bilaterian taxa